Bradley Chance Saltzman (born June 30, 1969) is a United States Space Force general who is the second and current chief of space operations. He served as the deputy chief of space operations for operations, cyber, and nuclear from 2020 to 2022. He is the first lieutenant general and the first general officer promoted into the Space Force.

Saltzman was born and raised in Kentucky. In 1991, he graduated from Boston University and was commissioned into the United States Air Force. 
He is a career missile and space operations officer with operational experience as a Minuteman III launch officer and as a satellite operator for the National Reconnaissance Office. He served as the last commander for both the 614th Space Operations Squadron and 1st Space Control Squadron, during which time he led the operations during the 2007 Chinese ASAT test. He also commanded the 460th Operations Group and Aerospace Data Facility-Colorado.

As a general officer, Saltzman has been called the "father of multi-domain operations" for his work in leading the Air Force multi-domain command and control effort. He was also the first non-flying officer to serve as deputy commander of the United States Air Forces Central Command. He transferred to the Space Force in 2020 where he served as its first chief operations officer.

Early life and education
Saltzman was born to Belinda C. Troutman in Daviess County, Kentucky on June 30, 1969. His father and grandfather were in the United States Army. He grew up in Bowling Green, Kentucky, attending Bowling Green High School where he played tennis.

Saltzman studied at Boston University on an Air Force scholarship, graduating in 1991 with a B.A. degree in history. He later completed a Master of Public Administration degree at the University of Montana in 1994 and a Master of Strategic Management degree from the George Washington University School of Business in 1998. He also attended the University of North Carolina and Harvard Kennedy School.

Saltzman underwent undergraduate missile training at Vandenberg Air Force Base, California, in 1992, less than a year after commissioning into the Air Force. In 1997, he earned the Air Assault Badge from attending the United States Army Air Assault School. He is also a space weapons officer, graduating from the USAF Weapons School in 2001, where they are taught how to be weapons instructors in their units. During his promotion to lieutenant general in 2020, General John W. Raymond pointed to Saltzman's entrance to the weapons school as one of his defining qualities. "[If] you think about Salty, that's what I think of: as an instructor," said Raymond. "Just last week, we went out to Vandenberg... Two young captains briefed me on what they were doing, and then I continued the tour. And for about another 20 or 30 minutes, I was looking and I said, 'Where'd General Saltzman go?' Well, he was sitting down with those two captains teaching, and sitting down having a conversation, and helping them think through what they had just briefed, and helping them understand the importance of the work they were doing."

Saltzman's other professional military education included attending Squadron Officer School, Air Command and Staff College, School of Advanced Air and Space Studies, Air War College, National Security Space Institute, Center For Creative Leadership, National Defense University, Institute for Defense Business, and LeMay Center for Doctrine Development and Education.

Military career

Early Air Force career

Saltzman commissioned into the United States Air Force on May 15, 1991, as a second lieutenant through Boston University’s Air Force Reserve Officer Training Corps program. After earning distinguished graduate honors from missile operational readiness training at Vandenberg Air Force Base, California, he held numerous missile crew, instructor, and evaluator positions at Malmstrom Air Force Base, culminating in his selection as the senior evaluator crew commander at the 10th Strategic Missile Squadron and 341st Strategic Missile Wing. While assigned to the 341st Missile Wing, he competed in the inaugural Guardian Challenge Space Competition and led the team to the 1995 Blanchard Trophy for the best missile operations squadron.

In 1996, Saltzman was selected for the Air Force Intern Program where he was assigned to Air Force office of the director of intelligence, surveillance, and reconnaissance and the Air Staff History Office. While on the Air Staff, he worked planning, programming and budgeting issues for the Information Warfare Panel, wrote higher headquarters inspection classification guidance for information operations and provided historical research for the chief of staff of the United States Air Force. In 1998, he was assigned to the National Reconnaissance Office (NRO), Operating Division Four (OD-4). In OD-4, he served as flight commander, senior flight commander and mission planning flight commander responsible for planning and command and control of three NRO reconnaissance satellite constellations. He also served as the on-console launch officer and led early-orbit engineering checkout for a $1 billion NRO satellite.

In 2000, Saltzman was selected to attend the USAF Weapons School. After graduating from the Weapons School in 2001, he was selected to remain at the Weapons School as an instructor. While there, he served as academics flight commander and an assistant director of operations.

From 2003 to 2007, Saltzman returned to Vandenberg to serve in a variety of assignments. In March 2003, he served in the Fourteenth Air Force’s strategy division as the chief of operational assessment during Operation Iraqi Freedom. In July 2005, he was assigned as the first chief of combat plans for the Joint Space Operations Center, and later, as chief of combat operations. He served as the last commander for both the 614th Space Operations Squadron and 1st Space Control Squadron before their inactivation and their missions were merged to the 614th Air and Space Operations Center in 2007 and 2008, respectively.

On January 11, 2007, then-Lieutenant Colonel Saltzman was serving under Colonel Stephen N. Whiting, then the director of the Joint Space Operations Center, and with Major DeAnna Burt, who succeeded Saltzman as chief of combat plans, when the 2007 Chinese anti-satellite missile test occurred. Recalling what he believes is the key date of modern military space operations history, Whiting noted, "We watched that test unfold over time, and we led the response for U.S. STRATCOM. We spent weeks and weeks figuring out how we would notify national leadership in real time. And those of us who was there knew the world had changed, on that day."

After his command tour, Saltzman studied at Harvard University as a national security fellow at the Harvard Kennedy School. In July 2009, he was promoted to colonel and returned to the Pentagon as the chief of the strategic plans and policy division. From 2010 to 2014, he was stationed at Buckley Air Force Base, Colorado as commander of the 460th Operations Group from June 2010 to June 2012 and commander of the NRO's Aerospace Data Facility-Colorado from June 2012 to June 2014.

In June 2014, Saltzman transferred to the Air Force Space Command (AFSPC) at Peterson Air Force Base, Colorado, as the deputy director of plans and programs. After less than a year in that stint, he was chosen as the executive officer to General John E. Hyten, then AFSPC commander. It was during this time when he was nominated for promotion to general officer in March 2016 and confirmed by the Senate a month later. On July 3, 2016, he was promoted to brigadier general.

Multi-Domain Command and Control

In September 2016, General David L. Goldfein outlined his three priorities as chief of staff of the United States Air Force, among them is advancing multi-domain, multi-functional command and control. Saltzman, who was then director of future operations at the Air Force headquarters, was handpicked by Goldfein to lead the multi-domain command and control (MDC2) effort. He served as director of Air Force Strategic Initiatives Group, running the service’s yearlong study of MDC2. For his work on MCD2, he has been called as the "father of multi-domain operations", which is now known in the United States Department of Defense as Joint All-Domain Command and Control.

After his stint at the Pentagon, Saltzman was chosen by Lieutenant General Joseph T. Guastella, commander of the U.S. Air Forces Central Command (AFCENT), as his deputy commander. He is the first AFCENT deputy commander to have come from a non-flying background.

Space Force
The United States Space Force was established while Saltzman at AFCENT as deputy commander. By July 2020, after his tour in Southwest Asia, he went back to the Pentagon to serve as acting director of staff of the United States Space Force, a post held by retiring Major General Clinton Crosier. He held this position until he was among the four Air Force major generals selected for promotion to lieutenant general and transfer to the Space Force.

Saltzman transferred into the Space Force and was promoted to lieutenant general during a ceremony on August 14, 2020, making him the first lieutenant general of the Space Force and the first general officer promoted into the new service. During the ceremony, General John W. Raymond remarked: 

Saltzman assumed the position of deputy chief of space operations for operations, cyber, and nuclear, becoming the first chief operations officer of the Space Force with overall responsibility for intelligence, operations, sustainment, cyber, and nuclear operations.

As chief operations officer, Saltzman plays a key role in defining readiness in the Space Force. He also has a role in the establishment of Space Force component commands to unified combatant commands. In November 2021, he announced that the service was establishing Space Force elements in the United States European Command, United States Indo-Pacific Command, United States Central Command, and United States Forces Korea.

On July 27, 2022, U.S. President Joe Biden nominated Saltzman for promotion to general and appointment as the second chief of space operations (CSO) of the Space Force. One of four lieutenant generals considered, Saltzman was a dark horse candidate for the job. The outgoing CSO, General Raymond, with whom he has close personal ties dating back years, strongly supported his selection. Saltzman testified before a United States Senate Committee on Armed Services hearing on 13 September 2022. In his opening statement, he mentioned three broad fronts he would focus on as CSO: maturing as an independent service, leveraging partnerships, and innovating to accomplish missions. His nomination was confirmed by voice vote of the Senate on September 29, 2022.

On November 2, 2022, Saltzman assumed office as the second chief of space operations during the Space Force's first change of responsibility ceremony. He pledged to build on the Space Force's achievements while also infusing the service with new approaches. In January 2023, he released three lines of efforts that would guide his term as chief: (1) fielding combat-ready forces, (2) amplifying the guardian spirit, and (3) partnering to win.

Personal life
Saltzman married Jennifer (Petersen) Saltzman on September 12, 1992. They have two children, John and Sarah.

Awards and decorations

Saltzman is the recipient of the following awards and decorations:

Badges

Ribbons

Awards
 Air Force Association's Thomas D. White Space Award (2021)

Dates of promotion

Writings

Books

Articles

Thesis

References

External links

 

|-

|-

|-

|-

|-

|-

|-

1969 births
Living people
Boston University alumni
University of Montana alumni
George Washington University School of Business alumni
Squadron Officer School alumni
Air Command and Staff College alumni
School of Advanced Air and Space Studies alumni
Air War College alumni
Harvard Kennedy School alumni
University of North Carolina at Chapel Hill alumni
Office of the Chief of Space Operations personnel
Military personnel from Kentucky
Recipients of the Defense Superior Service Medal
Recipients of the Legion of Merit
United States Air Force generals
United States Space Force generals
Chiefs of Space Operations